is a Japanese football player who plays as a goalkeeper for Hokkaido Consadole Sapporo.

Club statistics
Updated to 11 April 2022.

References

External links

Profile at Thespakusatsu Gunma
Profile at Kamatamare Sanuki

1992 births
Living people
Association football people from Hokkaido
Japanese footballers
J1 League players
J2 League players
J3 League players
Fagiano Okayama players
Hokkaido Consadole Sapporo players
Kamatamare Sanuki players
Thespakusatsu Gunma players
Shonan Bellmare players
Kyoto Sanga FC players
Association football goalkeepers
People from Hakodate